Limonium perezii is a species of Limonium known by the common names Perez's sea lavender and seafoam statice. It is also known as simply statice (reflecting the former name of the genus), sea lavender or marsh rosemary (common names for the genus). It is native to the coasts of the Canary Islands but are widely used in gardens throughout the world.

Description
This is a tough perennial herb growing from a woody rhizome. The small flower has lavender sepals and white petals.

Naming
As a widely used garden plant, it is often referred to by the common names Perez's sea lavender and seafoam statice, as well as variations on the name of the genus (former name Statice, current name Limonium and common names sea lavender and marsh rosemary). It may be referred to by the Afrikaans name papierblom or the common name everlasting in South Africa.

Origin and distribution

Limonium perezii  is native to the Canary Islands, but widely cultivated as a garden plant.

References

External links
Jepson Manual Treatment
Photo gallery

perezii
Endemic flora of the Canary Islands
Garden plants of Europe
Drought-tolerant plants